Carl Allen (born April 25, 1961) is an American jazz drummer.

Allen attended William Paterson University.

He has worked with a wide variety of musicians, including Freddie Hubbard, Jackie McLean, George Coleman, Phil Woods, the Benny Green Trio and Rickie Lee Jones.

It was with Green that Allen met bassist Christian McBride.  The two have teamed up frequently, working for many combos of big name leaders.  McBride recruited Allen for his band, Christian McBride & Inside Straight.  Allen is that quintet's drummer for both its first recording, Kinda Brown, and its road tours.

In 1988 Allen and Vincent Herring founded Big Apple Productions, which produced several albums featuring young jazz performers.

He joined the faculty of The Juilliard School in 2001, and became the Artistic Director of Jazz Studies in 2008. He was replaced as director by Wynton Marsalis in 2013, and left Juilliard at the end of the academic year.

In 2011, Allen appeared as himself in two episodes of the HBO series Tremé, in a studio recording scene in New York City.

In 2014, he formed his own group, The Art of Elvin to pay tribute to Art Blakey and Elvin Jones. The band debuted at the Percussive Arts Society (PAS) conference in Indianapolis, Indiana with Allen on drums, Freddie Hendrix (trumpet), Tivon Pennicott (tenor sax), Xavier Davis (piano), Yasushi Nakamura (bass).

In 2021, Allen joined the faculty of the UMKC Conservatory in Kansas City as the William D. and Mary Grant Endowed Professor of Jazz Studies.

Discography

As leader
 The Pursuer (Atlantic, 1994)
 Testimonial (Atlantic, 1995)

Collaborations
 Live from the Detroit Jazz Festival 2013 (Mack Avenue, 2014)

Co-led with Rodney Whitaker
 Get Ready (Mack Avenue, 2007)
 Work to Do (Mack Avenue, 2009)

With Manhattan Project
 Dreamboat (Alfa Jazz/Timeless , 2000)
 Piccadilly Square (Alfa Jazz/Timeless )
 The Dark Side of Dewey (Alfa Jazz/Evidence , 1996)
 Echoes of Our Heroes (Alfa Jazz Japan, 1996)
 We Remember Cannonball (Alfa Jazz Japan, 1997)

As sideman 
With Don Braden
 After Dark (Criss Cross, 1994)
 The Time Is Now (Criss Cross, 1994)
 Wish List (Criss Cross, 1994)

With Cyrus Chestnut
 The Nutman Speaks (Alfa Jazz )
 The Nutman Speaks Again (Alfa Jazz , 2003)
 Another Direction (Alfa Jazz )

With Art Farmer
 The Company I Keep (Arabesque, 1994)
 The Meaning of Art (Arabesque, 1995)
 Silk Road (Arabesque, 1997)

With Benny Golson
 Up Jumped Benny (Arkadia Jazz, 1997)
 One Day, Forever (Arkadia Jazz, 2001) – recorded in 1999
 Terminal 1 (Concord, 2004)
 New Time, New 'Tet (Concord, 2009)
 Horizon Ahead (HighNote, 2016)

With the Benny Green Trio
 Blue Notes (Toshiba-EMI Japan)
 That's Right (Blue Note)
 Testifyin! (Blue Note)

With Vincent Herring
 Evidence (Landmark, 1991)
 Dawnbird (Landmark, 1993)
 Folklore: Live at the Village Vanguard (MusicMasters, 1994)

With Freddie Hubbard
 Life Flight (Blue Note)
 Topsy (Alfa Jazz )
 MMTC (MusicMasters )

With Jackie McLean
 Dynasty (Triloka)
 Rites of Passage (Triloka)
 The J-Mac Attack (Birdology/Verve )

With Woody Shaw
 Double Take (Blue Note, 1985)
 Imagination (Muse, 1987)

With Christian McBride
 People Music (Mack Avenue, 2013)
 Live at the Village Vanguard (Mack Avenue, 2021)

With others
 Arkadia Jazz All Stars, Thank You, Joe!
 Donald Brown, Sources of Inspiration (Muse, 1989)
 Donald Byrd, A City Called Heaven (Landmark, 1991)
 Dan Faulk, Focusing In (Criss Cross Jazz, 1992)
 Ricky Ford, Hot Brass (Muse, 1991)
 Donald Harrison and Terrence Blanchard, Crystal Stair (Columbia Records, 1987)
 Dewey Redman, African Venus (Evidence, 1992)
 Phil Woods, Alto Summit (Milestone, 1996)
 Eliane Elias, Everything I Love (Blue Note and EMI, 2000)

References

External links
Official site
Discography at SonyBMG Masterworks

American jazz drummers
African-American drummers
1961 births
Living people
Musicians from Wisconsin
Male drummers
20th-century American drummers
American male drummers
William Paterson University alumni
20th-century American male musicians
American male jazz musicians
21st-century American drummers
21st-century American male musicians
20th-century African-American musicians
21st-century African-American musicians